Amala Akkineni (née Mukherjee) is an Indian actress, Bharatanatyam dancer, and animal welfare activist. She has predominantly worked in Tamil films, in addition to Telugu, Hindi, Malayalam, and Kannada-language films. She was a leading actress in the Tamil film industry from 1986 to 1992 and has appeared in many blockbusters in Tamil and other languages. She has won two Filmfare Awards South, namely Best Actress – Malayalam for the 1991 film Ulladakkam and Best Supporting Actress – Telugu for the 2012 film Life Is Beautiful. Amala is the co-founder of Blue Cross of Hyderabad, a non-government organisation (NGO) in Hyderabad, India, which works towards the welfare of animals and preservation of animal rights in India.

Early life
Amala was born in Calcutta (present-day Kolkata) to a Bengali Indian Navy officer and an Irish mother. Their family soon shifted to Madras (present-day Chennai) where she was brought up. She has a brother.

Amala holds a Bachelor of Fine Arts degree in Bharatanatyam from Kalakshetra college of fine arts, Madras now Chennai. She gave many live performances worldwide. She is fluent in English, Tamil and Telugu, and can understand Bengali.

Personal life
Amala married Telugu actor Nagarjuna on 11 June 1992 and the couple has a son, actor Akhil Akkineni born in 1994. She is the step-mother of actor Naga Chaitanya. They currently live in Hyderabad.

Career
She was persuaded to join films by T. Rajendar, who visited her home with his wife Usha and convinced her mother to let her act in the film, which would be a classical film featuring her Bharatanatyam dancing. That film was Mythili Ennai Kaathali (1986) which was a huge box office hit. Winning overnight fame, she charmed cinegoers in a flurry of fifty films, including a number of Tamil box office hits. She acted with her future husband Akkineni Nagarjuna in hits such as Nirnayam and Siva. She received Filmfare Award for Best Actress – Malayalam for the film Ulladakkam (1991).

She quit acting in 1992 following her marriage to Nagarjuna. After a hiatus of 20 years she made a comeback in 2012 with the Telugu film Life is Beautiful. She received a CineMAA Award for Best Outstanding Actress and Telugu category Filmfare Award for best supporting actress in 2013 for her portrayal.

She returned to Malayalam cinema with C/O Saira Banu after a gap of 25 years, since Ulladakkam.

Filmography

Tamil

Telugu

Hindi

Kannada

Malayalam

Television

Awards and honours

Film awards

Social welfare awards 

 2012: Jeev Daya Purashkaar from Animal Welfare Board of India 
 2017: Nari Shakti Award from Ministry of Women and Child Development

References

External links

1968 births
Living people
Actresses in Tamil cinema
20th-century Indian actresses
Actresses in Hindi cinema
Actresses in Kannada cinema
Indian film actresses
Actresses in Malayalam cinema
Bengali actresses
Indian people of Irish descent
Indian women activists
Kalakshetra Foundation alumni
Activists from West Bengal
Actresses from Kolkata
21st-century Indian actresses
Indian television actresses
Actresses in Telugu cinema
Actresses in Telugu television
Actresses in Tamil television
Actresses in Hindi television
Actresses of European descent in Indian films
Filmfare Awards South winners
CineMAA Awards winners